Southland Independent School District is a public school district based in the community of Southland, Texas (USA).

Located in Garza County, portions of the district extend into Lynn and Lubbock counties.

Academic achievement
In 2009, the school district was rated "academically acceptable" by the Texas Education Agency.

Special programs

Athletics
Southland High School plays six-man football.

See also

List of school districts in Texas

References

External links
 Southland ISD

School districts in Garza County, Texas
School districts in Lynn County, Texas
School districts in Lubbock County, Texas